M. DuMont Schauberg is one of Germany's oldest and largest publishing houses. It was founded by Bertram Hilden in 1620.

The company has been run by the Neven du Mont family since 1805, when Marcus du Mont acquired the Kölnische Zeitung – then the business's main newspaper. M. DuMont Schauberg has acquired numerous local and national newspapers and magazines. DuMont Schauberg's father, Kurt Neven DuMont, was a member of the German Nazi party, while his publishing house promoted Nazi ideology.

The company's headquarters is located in Cologne. The largest newspaper published by M. DuMont Schauberg is the Kölner Stadt-Anzeiger, published since 1876. It has the largest circulation in the Cologne/Bonn Region.

On October 1, 2020, the media group gave itself a new structure under company law. In this restructuring, DuMont wants to transform itself from a group of companies into a group of companies. In the process, a separate advisory board was created for the Regional Media business unit. This includes shareholder and Supervisory Board Chairwoman Isabella Neven DuMont, DuMont CEO Christoph Bauer, and CFO Stefan Hütwohl;  in addition, since 2021, media managers Britta Weddeling (Marvel Fusion) and Katja Nettesheim (Mediate and Culcha).

Newspapers and magazines 
Newspaper and magazines published by M. DuMont Schauberg:
 Berliner Kurier (circulation 2010: 123,010, ownership: 65%)
 Berliner Zeitung (circulation 2010: 147,993, ownership: 65%)
 Express (circulation 2015: 132,836 ownership: 100%)
 Frankfurter Rundschau (circulation 2008: 152,500, ownership: 50.1%)
 General-Anzeiger (circulation 2008: 82,176, ownership: 18%)
 Hamburger Morgenpost (circulation 2010: 112,935, ownership: 100%)
 Kölner Stadt-Anzeiger (circulation 2010: 337,390 incl. Kölnische Rundschau, ownership: 100%)
 Kölnische Rundschau
 Live! (circulation ca. 50.000)
 Mitteldeutsche Zeitung (circulation 2010: 230,028, ownership: 100%)
 Naumburger Tageblatt (circulation 2008: 14,450, ownership: 24.9%)
 Netzeitung

See also 
 Bertelsmann
 Cologne

Notes and references

External links 

  

Book publishing companies of Germany
Newspaper companies of Germany
Publishing companies of Germany
Mass media in Cologne
Companies based in Cologne
1802 establishments in the Holy Roman Empire